Sweeney Todd: The Demon Barber of Fleet Street is a 2007 musical slasher film directed by Tim Burton and an adaptation of the Tony Award-winning 1979 musical of the same name. The film retells the melodramatic Victorian tale of Sweeney Todd (Johnny Depp), an English barber and serial killer who, while seeking revenge on Judge Turpin (Alan Rickman) who wrongfully convicted and exiled him to steal his wife, murders his customers and, with the help of his accomplice, Mrs. Lovett (Helena Bonham Carter), processes their corpses into meat pies.

Having been struck by the cinematic qualities of Sondheim's musical while still a student, Burton had entertained the notion of a film version since the early 1980s. However, it was not until 2006 that he had the opportunity to realize this ambition, when DreamWorks Pictures announced his appointment as replacement for director Sam Mendes, who had been working on such an adaptation. Sondheim, although not directly involved, was extensively consulted during production. Depp, not known for his singing, took lessons in preparation for his role, which producer Richard D. Zanuck acknowledged was something of a gamble.

Sweeney Todd: The Demon Barber of Fleet Street was released in the United States on 21 December 2007 and in the United Kingdom on 25 January 2008. Grossing over $150 million worldwide, the film was praised for the performances of the cast, musical numbers, costume and set design, and faithfulness to the 1979 musical.

Plot
Benjamin Barker, a barber, arrives in London, accompanied by the young sailor Anthony Hope ("No Place Like London"). He explains that fifteen years earlier, he was falsely convicted and exiled to Australia for life by the cruel and corrupt Judge Turpin, who lusted after Barker's wife Lucy. Barker, having escaped from his prison, adopts the alias "Sweeney Todd" and returns to his old Fleet Street shop, situated above Nellie Lovett's meat pie shop, where she sells self-proclaimed terrible pies ("Worst Pies in London"). Lovett tells him that after he was sent to prison, Turpin raped Lucy, who then poisoned herself with arsenic ("Poor Thing"). Todd vows revenge and re-opens his barbershop after Mrs. Lovett, who loves him unrequitedly, presents him with his old straight razors ("My Friends").

The Barkers' now teenage daughter Johanna is in Turpin's custody, and he keeps her locked upstairs in his house, where he spies on her through a hole in her bedroom wall. She sings, longing for freedom ("Green Finch and Linnet Bird"). Anthony hears her singing and becomes enamored with her, but is caught by Turpin and driven away by his henchman, Beadle Bamford. He vows to rescue her from Turpin ("Johanna").

Later, Todd denounces faux-Italian barber Adolfo Pirelli's hair tonic as a fraud ("Pirelli's Miracle Elixer") and humiliates him in a public shaving contest judged by Bamford ("The Contest"). A few days later, Pirelli arrives at Todd's shop, with his assistant, an orphan boy named Toby. Pirelli identifies himself as Todd's former assistant, Davy Collins, and threatens to reveal Todd's true identity unless Todd gives him half his earnings. Todd beats Collins unconscious with a tea kettle, hides him in a trunk, and later slits his throat.

After receiving advice from Bamford ("Ladies in their Sensitivities"), Turpin visits Todd for a shave, intent on marrying Johanna. Todd shaves Turpin, preparing to slit his throat ("Pretty Women"), but they are interrupted by Anthony, who reveals his plan to elope with Johanna before noticing Turpin. An angered Turpin renounces Todd's service and leaves. Todd swears revenge on the entire world, vowing to kill as many people as possible while he waits for another chance to kill Turpin ("Epiphany"). Mrs. Lovett gets the idea to bake Todd's victims into pies ("A Little Priest"), and Todd rigs his barber chair to drop his victims' bodies through a trapdoor and into her bakehouse. Anthony searches for Johanna, whom Turpin has sent to an insane asylum upon discovering her plans to elope with Anthony, as Todd goes on a killing spree ("Johanna Reprise").

With the barbering and pie-making businesses prospering, Mrs. Lovett takes Tobias Toby on as her assistant and tells an uninterested Todd of her plans to marry him and move to the seaside ("By the Sea"). Anthony discovers Johanna's whereabouts and, following Todd's suggestion, poses as a wigmaker's apprentice to rescue her. Todd has Toby deliver a letter to Turpin, telling him where Johanna will be brought when Anthony frees her. Toby has become wary of Todd and tells Mrs. Lovett of his suspicions, vowing to protect her ("Not While I'm Around"). Mrs. Lovett lures him into the basement and locks him in.

Bamford arrives at the pie shop, informing Mrs. Lovett that neighbors have been complaining of the stink from her chimney. Todd distracts him with an offer of a free grooming and murders him. Toby discovers the bodies of Todd and Mrs. Lovett's victims in the basement and hides in the sewers. Mrs. Lovett informs Todd of Toby's suspicions, and the pair search for the boy with the intent to kill him. Meanwhile, Anthony brings Johanna, disguised as a boy, to the shop, and has her wait there while he leaves to find Todd.

A Beggar Woman enters the shop looking for Bamford, and Johanna hides in the trunk. The woman recognizes Todd, but upon hearing Turpin coming, Todd kills her and sends her through the trapdoor in the floor. As Turpin enters, Todd explains that Johanna had repented and is coming to him, then offers a free shave in the meantime. When Turpin finally recognizes Todd as Benjamin Barker, Todd stabs him several times, cuts his throat, and drops him into the bakehouse. Todd finds Johanna, still disguised, and  prepares to kill her as well, not recognizing her as his daughter. However, hearing Mrs. Lovett scream in the basement when the dying Turpin grabs at her dress, Todd spares Johanna.

Todd discovers that the Beggar Woman was his wife Lucy, whom he believed to be dead, and that Mrs. Lovett deliberately misled him so she could have him to herself. Enraged, Todd pretends to forgive her and dances  with her before hurling her into the bakehouse oven as revenge, then cradles Lucy's dead body in his arms. Toby, who comes out of the sewers, appears and Todd, now wishing to die, allows Toby to slit his throat with his own razor. Toby leaves as Todd bleeds to death over his dead wife ("Final Scene").

Cast

Production

Development

Tim Burton first saw Stephen Sondheim's 1979 stage musical, Sweeney Todd: The Demon Barber of Fleet Street, as a CalArts student in London in 1980. Burton recalled his experience of seeing the show, saying, "I was still a student, I didn't know if I would be making movies or working in a restaurant, I had no idea what I would be doing. I just wandered into the theatre and it just blew me away because I'd never really seen anything that had the mixture of all those elements. I actually went three nights in a row because I loved it so much." Burton was not a fan of the musical genre but was struck by how cinematic the musical was, and repeatedly attended subsequent performances. He described it as a silent film with music, and was "dazzled both by the music and its sense of the macabre." When his directing career took off in the late 1980s, Burton approached Sondheim with a view to making a cinematic adaptation, but nothing came of it. Sondheim said, "[Burton] went off and did other things."

Director Sam Mendes had been working on a film version of the story for several years, and in June 2003 Sondheim was approached to write the script. Although he turned down the offer, Mendes and producer Walter F. Parkes obtained his approval to use writer John Logan instead. Logan had previously collaborated with Parkes on Gladiator, and claimed his biggest challenge in adapting the Sondheim stage play "was taking a sprawling, magnificent Broadway musical and making it cinematic, and an emotionally honest film. Onstage, you can have a chorus sing as the people of London, but I think that would be alienating in a movie." Mendes left to direct the 2005 film Jarhead, and Burton took over as director after his project, Ripley's Believe It or Not!, fell apart due to its excessive budget.

When Burton was hired, he reworked the screenplay with Logan. Logan felt they agreed over the film's tone due to "share[d] stunted childhoods watching Amicus movies". Turning a three-hour stage musical into a two-hour film required some changes. Some songs were shortened, while others were completely removed. Burton said, "In terms of the show, it was three hours long, but we weren't out to film the Broadway show, we were out to make a movie, so we tried to keep the pace like those old melodramas. Sondheim himself is not a real big fan of movie musicals, so he was really open to honing it down to a more pacey shape." Burton and Logan also reduced the prominence of other secondary elements, such as the romance between Todd's daughter Johanna and Anthony, to allow them to focus on the triangular relationship between Todd, Mrs. Lovett, and Toby.

Casting

DreamWorks announced Burton's appointment in August 2006, and Johnny Depp was cast as Todd. Christopher Lee, Peter Bowles, Anthony Head, and five other actors were set to play the ghost narrators, but their roles were cut (Head does appear in an uncredited cameo as a gentleman who congratulates Depp after the shaving contest). According to Lee, these deletions were due to time constraints caused by a break in filming during March 2007, while Depp's daughter recovered from an illness. Burton's domestic partner Helena Bonham Carter was cast in October 2006, as well as Sacha Baron Cohen. In December 2006, Alan Rickman was cast. In January 2007, Laura Michelle Kelly was cast as Lucy Barker. Timothy Spall was added to the cast, and said he was urged to audition by his daughter, who wanted him to work with Depp. He recalled, "I really wanted this one – I knew Tim was directing and that Johnny Depp was going to be in it. My daughter, my youngest daughter, really wanted me to do it for that reason – Johnny Depp was in it. (She came on set to meet Depp) and he was really delightful to her, she had a great time. Then, I took her to the junket – and (Depp) greeted her like an old pal when he saw her. I've got plenty of brownie points at the moment."

Three members of the cast had never been in a film before: Ed Sanders was cast as Toby, Jayne Wisener as Johanna, and Jamie Campbell Bower, who auditioned, and after four days got the part of Anthony said, "I think I weed myself. I was out shopping at the time and I got this call on my mobile. I was just like, 'OH MY GOD!' Honestly, I was like a little girl running around this shop like oh-my-god-oh-my-god-oh-my-god."

Filming
Filming began on February 5, 2007 at Pinewood Studios, and was completed by May 11, despite a brief interruption when Depp's daughter was taken seriously ill. Burton opted to film in London, where he had felt "very much at home" since his work on Batman in 1989. Production designer Dante Ferretti created a darker, more sinister London by adapting Fleet Street and its surrounding area. Burton initially planned to use minimal sets and film in front of a green screen, but decided against it, stating that physical sets helped actors get into a musical frame of mind: "Just having people singing in front of a green screen seemed more disconnected".

Depp created his own image of Todd. Heavy purple and brown make-up was applied around his eyes to suggest fatigue and rage, as if "he's never slept". Burton said of the character Sweeney Todd, "We always saw him as a sad character, not a tragic villain or anything. He's basically a dead person when you meet him; the only thing that's keeping him going is the one single minded thing which is tragic. You don't see anything else around him." Depp said of the character, "He makes Sid Vicious look like the innocent paper boy. He's beyond dark. He's already dead. He's been dead for years." Depp also commented on the streak of white in Todd's hair, saying, "The idea was that he'd had this hideous trauma, from being sent away, locked away. That streak of white hair became the shock of that rage. It represented his rage over what had happened. It's certainly not the first time anyone's used it. But it's effective. It tells a story all by itself. My brother had a white spot growing up, and his son has this kind of shock of white in his hair."

Burton insisted that the film be bloody, as he felt stage versions of the play which cut back on the bloodshed robbed it of its power. For him, "Everything is so internal with Sweeney that [the blood] is like his emotional release. It's more about catharsis than it is a literal thing." Producer Richard D. Zanuck said that "[Burton] had a very clear plan that he wanted to lift that up into a surreal, almost Kill Bill kind of stylization. We had done tests and experiments with the neck slashing, with the blood popping out. I remember saying to Tim, 'My God, do we dare do this?'" On set, the fake blood was colored orange to render correctly on the desaturated color film used, and crew members wore bin liners to avoid getting stained while filming. This macabre tone made some studios nervous, and it was not until Warner Bros. Pictures, DreamWorks and Paramount had signed up for the project that the film's $50 million budget was covered. Burton said "the studio was cool about it and they accepted it because they knew what the show was. Any movie is a risk, but it is nice to be able to do something like that that doesn't fit into the musical or slasher movie categories."

After the filming, Burton said of the cast, "All I can say is this is one of the best casts I've ever worked with. These people are not professional singers, so to do a musical like this which I think is one of the most difficult musicals, they all went for it. Every day on the set was a very, very special thing for me. Hearing all these guys sing, I don't know if I can ever have an experience like that again." Burton said of the singing, "You can't just lip synch, you'd see the throat and the breath, every take they all had to belt it out. It was very enjoyable for me to see, with music on the set everybody just moved differently. I'd seen Johnny (Depp) act in a way I'd never seen before, walking across the room or sitting in the chair, picking up a razor or making a pie, whatever. They all did it in a way that you could sense."

Depp said of working with Baron Cohen, when asked what he was like in real life (meaning, not doing one of his trademark characters), "He's not what I expected. I didn't look at those characters and think, 'This will be the sweetest guy in the world'. He's incredibly nice. A real gentleman, kind of elegant. I was impressed with him. He's kind of today's equivalent of Peter Sellers."

Music

Burton wanted to avoid the traditional approach of patches of dialogue interrupted by song, "We didn't want it to be what I'd say was a traditional musical with a lot of dialogue and then singing. That's why we cut out a lot of choruses and extras singing and dancing down the street. Each of the characters, because a lot of them are repressed and have their emotions inside, the music was a way to let them express their feelings."

He cut the show's famous opening number, "The Ballad of Sweeney Todd", explaining, "Why have a chorus singing about 'attending the tale of Sweeney Todd' when you could just go ahead and attend it?" Sondheim acknowledged that, in adapting a musical to film, the plot has to be kept moving, and was sent MP3 files of his shortened songs by Mike Higham, the film's music producer, for approval. Several other songs were also cut, and Sondheim noted that there were "many changes, additions and deletions... [though]... if you just go along with it, I think you'll have a spectacular time." To create a larger, more cinematic feel, the score was re-orchestrated by the stage musical's original orchestrator, Jonathan Tunick, who increased the orchestra from 27 musicians to 78.

The Deluxe Complete Edition soundtrack was released on December 18, 2007. Depp's singing was described by a New York Times reviewer as "harsh and thin, but amazingly forceful". Another critic adds that, though Depp's voice "does not have much heft or power", "his ear is obviously excellent, because his pitch is dead-on accurate... Beyond his good pitch and phrasing, the expressive colorings of his singing are crucial to the portrayal. Beneath this Sweeney’s vacant, sullen exterior is a man consumed with a murderous rage that threatens to burst forth every time he slowly takes a breath and is poised to speak. Yet when he sings, his voice crackles and breaks with sadness."

Marketing
The film's marketing has been criticized for not advertising it as a musical. Michael Halberstam of the Writers' Theatre said, "By de-emphasizing the score to the extent they did in the trailer, it is possible the producers were condescending to us – a tactic which cannot ultimately end in anything but tears." In the UK, a number of audience members walked out of the film on realizing it was a musical, and complaints that advertisements for the film were deliberately misleading were made to both the Advertising Standards Authority and Trading Standards agency. The studios involved opted for a low-key approach to their marketing. Producer Walter Parkes stated, "All these things that could be described as difficulties could also be the movie's greatest strengths." Warner Bros. felt it should take a similar approach to marketing as with The Departed, with little early exposure and discouraging talk of awards.

Release
Sweeney Todd: The Demon Barber of Fleet Street officially opened at the United States box office on December 21, 2007, in 1,249 theatres, and took $9,300,805 in its opening weekend. Worldwide releases followed during January and February 2008, with the film performing well in the United Kingdom and Japan. The film grossed $52,898,073 in the United States and Canada, and $99,625,091 in other markets, accumulating a worldwide total of $152,523,164. In the United States, the Marcus Theaters Corporation was not initially planning to screen the film following its premiere, because it was unable to reach a pricing agreement with Paramount. However, the dispute was resolved in time for the official release.

Critical reception

Although Sondheim was cautious of a cinematic adaptation of his musical, he was largely impressed by the results. Sweeney Todd: The Demon Barber of Fleet Street received critical acclaim, and the performances, visuals, production design, costume design and faithfulness to its source material were praised. The review aggregator Rotten Tomatoes reports that 86% of critics gave the film positive reviews based on 232 reviews and an average rating of 7.7/10. The site's critical consensus reads, "Full of pith and Grand Guignol grossness, this macabre musical is perfectly helmed and highly entertaining. Tim Burton masterfully stages the musical in a way that will make you think he has done this many times before." Metacritic assigned the film an average score of 83 out of 100, based on 39 reviews, indicating "universal acclaim". Sweeney Todd appeared on many critics' top ten lists of the best films of 2007.

Of the reviewers, Time rated it an A-minus and added, "Burton and Depp infuse the brilliant cold steel of Stephen Sondheim's score with a burning passion. Helena Bonham Carter and a superb supporting cast bring focused fury to this musical nightmare. It's bloody great." Time's Richard Corliss named the film one of its top ten movies of 2007, placing it fifth. Roger Ebert of the Chicago Sun-Times gave it four stars out of four, lauding Burton's visual style. In his review in Variety, Todd McCarthy called it "both sharp and fleet" and "a satisfying screen version of Stephen Sondheim's landmark 1979 theatrical musical ... things have turned out uniformly right thanks to highly focused direction by Tim Burton, expert screw-tightening by scenarist John Logan, and haunted and musically adept lead performances from Johnny Depp and Helena Bonham Carter. Assembled artistic combo assures the film will reap by far the biggest audience to see a pure Sondheim musical, although just how big depends on the upscale crowd’s tolerance for buckets of blood, and the degree to which the masses stay away due to the whiff of the highbrow." Lisa Schwarzbaum of Entertainment Weekly gave the film a B-plus in its Movie Reviews section and stated, "To stage a proper Sweeney Todd, necks must be slit, human flesh must be squished into pastries, and blood ought to spurt in fountains and rivers of death. Enter Tim Burton, who ... has tenderly art-directed soup-thick, tomato-red, fake-gore blood with the zest of a Hollywood-funded Jackson Pollock." She went on to refer to the piece as "opulent, attentive ... so finely minced a mixture of Sondheim's original melodrama and Burton's signature spicing that it's difficult to think of any other filmmaker so naturally suited for the job."

In its DVD Reviews section, EW's Chris Nashawaty gave the film an A-minus, stating, "Depp's soaring voice makes you wonder what other tricks he's been hiding... Watching Depp's barber wield his razors... it's hard not to be reminded of Edward Scissorhands frantically shaping hedges into animal topiaries 18 years ago... and all of the twisted beauty we would've missed out on had [Burton and Depp] never met." In Rolling Stone, Peter Travers awarded it 3½ out of 4 stars and added, "Sweeney Todd is a thriller-diller from start to finish: scary, monstrously funny and melodically thrilling ... [the film] is a bloody wonder, intimate and epic, horrific and heart-rending as it flies on the wings of Sondheim's most thunderously exciting score." As with Time, the critic ranked it fifth on his list of the best movies of 2007. Kirk Honeycutt of The Hollywood Reporter said, "The blood juxtaposed to the music is highly unsettling. It runs contrary to expectations. Burton pushes this gore into his audiences' faces so as to feel the madness and the destructive fury of Sweeney's obsession. Teaming with Depp, his long-time alter ego, Burton makes Sweeney a smoldering dark pit of fury and hate that consumes itself. With his sturdy acting and surprisingly good voice, Depp is a Sweeney Todd for the ages." Harry Knowles gave the film a highly positive review, calling it Burton's best film since Ed Wood, his favorite Burton film, and said it was possibly superior. He praised all of the cast and the cinematography, but noted it would probably not appeal to non-musical fans due to the dominance of music in the film.

Awards and nominations
Sweeney Todd: The Demon Barber of Fleet Street received four Golden Globe nominations at the January 2008 65th Golden Globe Awards, winning two. The film won the award for Best Motion Picture in the Musical or Comedy genre, and Depp for his performance as Sweeney Todd. Burton was nominated for Best Director, and Helena Bonham Carter was nominated for her performance as Mrs. Lovett. The film was included in the National Board of Review of Motion Pictures's top ten films of 2007, and Burton was presented with their award for Best Director. The film was also nominated for two BAFTA awards, in the categories of Costume Design and Make Up and Hair. Sweeney Todd further received three Oscar nominations at the 80th Academy Awards: Best Actor in a Leading Role for Depp; Best Achievement in Costume Design; and Best Achievement in Art Direction, which it won. Depp won the award for Best Villain at the 2008 MTV Movie Awards, where he thanked his fans for "sticking with [him] on this very obtuse and strange road," and the Choice Movie Villain award at the Teen Choice Awards. At Spike TV's 2008 Scream Awards, the film won two awards: Best Horror Movie, and Best Actor in a Horror Movie or TV Show (Depp).

It was listed as number 490 on Empires 500 Greatest films of all time.

Home media release
Sweeney Todd: The Demon Barber of Fleet Street was released on DVD in the United States on April 1, 2008, and the UK on May 19. A Blu-ray was released on October 21, 2008. An HD DVD release was announced for the same date, but due to the discontinuation of the format, Paramount canceled this version in preference for international distribution of the Blu-ray release.

The DVD version has thus far sold approximately 1,892,489 copies, bringing in more than $38 million in revenue.

References

External links

 
 
 
 
 
 
 
 https://veermag.com/2022/03/sweeney-selina-and-the-antiheroic-tim-burton-revolutionary

2000s English-language films
2000s American films
2000s British films
2007 films
2000s musical films
2000s slasher films
2000s serial killer films
British horror films
British splatter films
British musical films
British slasher films
British drama films
British serial killer films
American musical films
American splatter films
American slasher films
American drama films
American serial killer films
American films about revenge
Gothic horror films
Romantic horror films
Films directed by Tim Burton
Films with screenplays by John Logan
Films produced by Richard D. Zanuck
Films produced by Walter F. Parkes
Films based on works by Stephen Sondheim
Films based on musicals
Films based on adaptations
Sweeney Todd
Films about cannibalism
Films about food and drink
Films about hairdressers
Uxoricide in fiction
Films set in the Victorian era
Films set in London
Films shot at Pinewood Studios
Films whose art director won the Best Art Direction Academy Award
Best Musical or Comedy Picture Golden Globe winners
Films featuring a Best Musical or Comedy Actor Golden Globe winning performance
DreamWorks Pictures films
Warner Bros. films
Paramount Pictures films
The Zanuck Company films